'Mautino Peak' is a peak at the west side of Packard Glacier in the Saint Johns Range of Victoria Land, Antarctica. It was named by the Advisory Committee on Antarctic Names for Commander Richard L. Mautino, U.S. Navy, officer-in-charge of the Naval Support Force winter-over detachment at McMurdo Station in 1972.

References

Mountains of Victoria Land
McMurdo Dry Valleys